Anas ibn Mālik ibn Naḍr al-Khazrajī al-Anṣārī ( (c.612 – c.712) was a well-known sahabi (companion) of the Islamic prophet Muhammad.

Biography

Anas ibn Malik, a member of the Najjar clan of the Khazraj tribe of Yathrib, was born ten years before the Muhammad's Hijrah. After his father, Malik ibn Nadr, died a non-Muslim, his mother, Umm Sulaim, remarried to  a new convert, Abu Talha ibn Thabit. Anas's half-brother from this marriage was Abdullah ibn Abi Talha.

When prophet Muhammad arrived in Medina in 622, Anas's mother presented him to prophet Muhammad as a servant to him.

After prophet Muhammad's death in 632, Anas participated in the wars of conquest. He was the last of the prominent Companions of the Prophet to die, having outlived Muhammad by 80 years. Anas died in 93 AH (712 CE) in Basra at the age of 103 (lunar) years.

Shrine 
The shrine of Anas Ibn Malik is located in Basra, Iraq. The grave of Anas Ibn Malik is a simple cenotaph. However, the shrine was destroyed with explosive devices. Despite the fact that the mosque and shrine is heavily damaged and walls stained with vandalism, the complex is still a popular place of visit by Muslims.

See also

Sunni view of the Sahaba
Anas ibn Nadhar

Notes

612 births
709 deaths
Sahabah hadith narrators
Year of birth uncertain
Khazrajite people
Ansar (Islam)